The 1987 Nürburgring Touring Car Grand Prix was the fourth round of the inaugural World Touring Car Championship. The race was held for cars eligible for Group A touring car regulations. It was held on July 12, 1987, at the Nürburgring, in Nürburg, West Germany.

The race was won by Klaus Ludwig and Klaus Niedzwiedz, driving a Ford Sierra RS Cosworth.

Class structure
Cars were divided into three classes based on engine capacity:
 Division 1: 1-1600cc
 Division 2: 1601-2500cc
 Division 3: Over 2500cc

Official results
Results were as follows:
| Entered: 39
| Started: 39
| Finished: 19

 Drivers in italics practiced in the car but did not take part in the race.

See also
 1987 World Touring Car Championship

References

1987 World Touring Car Championship season
1987 in West German motorsport